Giancarlo Valt (born 7 May 1941 in Cortina d'Ampezzo, Italy) is an Italian curler.

At the international level, he is a  bronze medallist.

At the national level, he is a six-time Italian men's champion curler (1979, 1980, 1981, 1982, 1984, 1985).

Teams

References

External links
 

Living people
1941 births
People from Cortina d'Ampezzo
Italian male curlers
Italian curling champions
Sportspeople from the Province of Belluno